Jair Edson Céspedes Zegarra (born 22 March 1984 in Arequipa, Peru) is a Peruvian footballer who plays for Deportivo Binacional in the Torneo Descentralizado.

International career
Jair made his debut for the Peru national football team on March 24, 2007 in a friendly against Japan. Céspedes was called up by Julio César Uribe to play in the 2007 Copa América. However, he did not appear on the pitch.

References

External links

1984 births
Living people
People from Arequipa
Association football wingers
Peruvian footballers
Peruvian expatriate footballers
Club Alianza Lima footballers
Deportivo Municipal footballers
Sport Boys footballers
Club Deportivo Universidad de San Martín de Porres players
Hapoel Ironi Kiryat Shmona F.C. players
Hapoel Petah Tikva F.C. players
Maccabi Ahi Nazareth F.C. players
Bnei Sakhnin F.C. players
Club Deportivo Universidad César Vallejo footballers
León de Huánuco footballers
Juan Aurich footballers
Sporting Cristal footballers
Cusco FC footballers
Peruvian Segunda División players
Peruvian Primera División players
Israeli Premier League players
Liga Leumit players
Peru international footballers
2007 Copa América players
2015 Copa América players
Copa América Centenario players
Expatriate footballers in Israel
Peruvian expatriate sportspeople in Israel